The Mikasa-class (ミカサ) locomotives were a group of steam tender locomotives of the Chosen Government Railway (Sentetsu) with 2-8-2 wheel arrangement. The "Mika" name came from the American naming system for steam locomotives, under which locomotives with 2-8-2 wheel arrangement were called "Mikado" in honour of the Emperor of Japan, as the first 2-8-2 locomotives in the world were built for Japan.

Of all Mika classes, 131 went to the Korean National Railroad in South Korea and 292 to the Korean State Railway in North Korea. Of these 423 locomotives, 356 were from Sentetsu; the other 67 were South Manchuria Railway Mikai-class engines on loan to Sentetsu along with Mika-type locomotives which had previously belonged to the twelve privately owned railways in Korea before 1945. Not included in this number, however, are the six SMR Mikai-class locomotives that were assigned to SMR's Rajin depot for operation on SMR's lines in northeastern Korea, and the eight SMR Mikaro-class locomotives likewise assigned to the Rajin depot; these fourteen locomotives were taken over by the Korean State Railway. Despite the DPRK government's extensive anti-Japanese propaganda, the railway nevertheless continues to use the "Mika" name officially for these locomotives even though it refers to the Japanese emperor.

The Mikasa class was also operated by the Central China Railway in Japanese-occupied China, and by the China Railway after the fall of China to communism, where they were designated JF9 class.

Description
Designed by Sentetsu based on the experiences with the rebuilding of the Pureshi class, the Mikasa class, along with the Pashishi and Tehoro classes, were the first locomotives designed by Sentetsu. Because they were designed specifically for Korean operating needs and conditions, these superheated, two-cylinder locomotives were a great success and proved very easy to build, operate and maintain.

The Mikasa, Pashishi and Tehoro classes all had large heating areas. From its inception, the Mikasa class was designed to use the lignite abundant in Korea, which is less efficient than the anthracite the American-built locomotives needed. The Mikasa class featured a combustion chamber firebox to achieve sufficient combustion of the coal, which in turn improved boiler efficiency. Following the experience with the Mikasas, combustion chamber fireboxes were installed on the JNR 9700 class and JNR D52 class locomotives built from 1943. To improve maintenance logistics, care was taken during the design process to maximise the number common components between the Pashishi and Mikasa classes.

Structurally it is generally an American design in its features, with the first dome being a sandbox, and the second being for steam. The firebox is located above the trailing axle. After the first 27 were completed, the design was modified, resulting in a slightly different appearance of the smokestack and the steam dome. The tender is a four-axle type, running on two four-wheel bogies of American Bettendorf design.

Construction
Between 1927 and 1945, 308 were built for Sentetsu in Japan and Korea by five different builders, and a further five were built after the end of the Pacific War for the KNR. Prior to 1945, eight units were built for the privately owned West Chosen Central Railway, and 38 for the Central China Railway. In all, a total of 398 were built, but there were many in various states of construction at the end of the war that were never completed.

Chosen Government Railway ミカサ (Mikasa) class
The first 70, which entered Sentetsu service prior to April 1938, were numbered ミカサ1701 through ミカサ1770; in Sentetsu's general renumbering of 1938, these became ミカサ1 through ミカサ70. Those that entered service after April 1938 were numbered according to the new system.

The Mikasa class became Sentetsu's standard locomotive for freight trains and trains on steeper lines, especially on trunk lines such as the Gyeongui and Gyeongbu Lines. During the Pacific War, the industrialisation of northern Korea was expanded on a large scale, and to meet the resulting sharp increase in freight demands in the area, large numbers of Mikasas were assigned to work on the Gyeongwon and Hamgyeong Lines, as well.

The exact dispersal of Sentetsu's Mikasa-class locomotives after the partition of Korea is uncertain.

West Chosen Central Railway ミカサ (Mikasa) class
As traffic volumes increased significantly through the Pacific War, the privately owned West Chosen Central Railway also found itself needing more power. As a result, eight Mikasa class locomotives were bought in 1943 and 1944. More were needed, but as the capacity of locomotive builders in Japan and Korea was already being stretched, Mikaro (ミカロ, Mika6) class locomotives were borrowed from the South Manchuria Railway (Mantetsu) instead.

After the partition of Korea all railways in both North and South were nationalised, and being located north of the 38th parallel, the West Chosen Central Railway's assets were taken over by the Korean State Railway.

Central China Railway ミカサ (Mikasa) class
The Central China Railway also bought locomotives built to the Sentetsu Mikasa design; a total of 38 were built by Kisha Seizō, Hitachi and Nippon Sharyō in 1943 and 1944. These were numbered ミカサ11 through ミカサ19, ミカサ110 through ミカサ137 and ミカサ320. After the war, these eventually ended up with the China Railway.

Postwar
The exact distribution of Sentetsu's Mikashi-class locomotives after the partition of Korea is uncertain, but they were operated by both the Korean National Railroad in the South and by the Korean State Railway in the North.

Korean National Railroad 미카3 (Mika3) class

Though the exact quantity and identities of the former Sentetsu Mikasa class locomotives that went to the Korean National Railroad isn't certain, there were at least 54 that were operated by the KNR. Additionally, a further five, which had been under construction for Sentetsu at the end of the Pacific War, were completed by Hitachi in 1946 and delivered to the KNR as 미카3-298 through 미카3-302 (works numbers 2022–2026); this was followed by eight, 미카3-314 through 미카3-321, built new in 1947. They were operated until at least 1968, by which time they were mostly relegated to shunting duties.

Korean State Railway 미가서 (Migasŏ) class/6300 series
The identities and quantity of Sentetsu's Mikasa class locomotives that ended up in North Korea is not known; another eight were taken over from the West Chosen Central Railway. They remained in service for many decades after the Korean War; some may still be in service at the present time. They were initially designated 미가서 (Migasŏ) class, and were later renumbered into the 6300 series; numbers higher than 100 were probably numbered into the 6400 series, as there were less than 24 Mikashi/Miganŏ-class locomotives in the DPRK, so numbers from 6425 on would have been free. How those taken over from the West Chosen Central Railway were numbered is unknown.

China Railways 解放9 (JF9) class
Following the end of the war, the Central China Railway was absorbed into the state-owned Republic of China Railway, and after the establishment of the People's Republic in 1949 and the subsequent establishment of the China Railway in 1950, the Central China Railway Mikasas were given the ㄇㄎ玖 (MK9) designation; in 1959 they were reclassified 解放9 (JF9, "Liberation 9"), numbered 3671 through 3710. Although they were classified ㄇㄎ玖/解放9, they are completely different from the Mantetsu Mikaku (ミカク) class. The last of the JF9s in China were retired in the 1990s. JF9 3673 has been preserved, and is on display at the China Railway Museum in Beijing.

Preserved examples

 In South Korea
 Mika3-129, at the Daejeon National Cemetery, on loan from the Daejeon Railway Vehicle Maintenance Centre
 Mika3-161, at the Korail Railroad Museum
 Mika3-244, at Imjingak
 Mika3-304, at Sammu Park in Jeju City
 In China:
 JF9 3673, at the China Railway Museum in Beijing.

In addition, the hulks of two Mikasa class locomotives which were destroyed during the Korean war are located within the DMZ and are deteriorating from exposure to the elements.

Gallery

References

Locomotives of Korea
Locomotives of South Korea
Locomotives of North Korea
Standard gauge locomotives of China
Railway locomotives introduced in 1927
2-8-2 locomotives
Gyeongseong Works locomotives
Hitachi locomotives
Kawasaki locomotives
Kisha Seizo locomotives
Nippon Sharyo locomotives